Conulariida is a poorly understood fossil group that has possible affinity with the Cnidaria. Their exact position as a taxon of extinct medusozoan cnidarians is highly speculative. Members of the Conulariida are commonly referred to as conulariids and appear in the fossil record from the latest parts of the Ediacaran period up until the Triassic.

Structure
The conulariids are fossils preserved as shell-like structures made up of rows of calcium phosphate rods, resembling an ice-cream cone with fourfold symmetry, usually four prominently-grooved corners. New rods were added as the organism grew in length; the rod-based growth falsely gives the fossils a segmented appearance.  Exceptional soft-part preservation has revealed that soft tentacles protruded from the wider end of the cone, and a holdfast from the pointed end attached the organisms to hard substrate. The prevailing reconstruction of the organism has it look superficially like a sea anemone sitting inside an angular, hard cone held perpendicular to the substrate. Conulariid shell is composed of francolite with carbonate ion concentration 8.1 wt%. The lattice parameters of conulariid apatite are a = 9.315(7) Å,
c = 6.888(3) Å.  The fine structure of their shell comprises multiple lamellae of alternately organic-rich and organic-poor layers.

Fossil record

With the inclusion of the possible Ediacaran conulariid Vendoconularia, which may or may not be a conulariid at all, and the definite late Ediacaran conulariid Paraconularia ediacara, the Conulata fossil record begins with undeniable specimens in the Upper Ediacaran and extends without significant break through numerous major mass extinctions. The Conulariids finally disappear from the fossil record during the Lower Triassic stage of the Triassic Period (~).

In North America, conulariids are generally more common in rocks of Ordovician and Carboniferous age.

Lifestyle
Conulariids apparently lived only in normal-marine waters, such as the oceans and inland seas. Fossils are commonly found in rocks representing offshore, even anoxic, marine bottom environments. This has led some scientists to infer that these animals may have drifted planktonically for some or all of their lives, ultimately being buried in the anoxic sediments beneath the oxic waters in which they lived. However, basic functional considerations (such as the great weight of the shell) make such interpretations difficult to maintain.

Phylogeny
About 20 genera and 150 species are known, but except for local occurrences, Conulariids are relatively uncommon.

The conulariids were originally thought to be anthozoan cnidarians. However, the lack of septa or other features diagnostic of anthozoans led researchers to abandon this hypothesis. Ivantsov and Fedonkin (2002) posit that the conulariids were ancestrally tri-radially symmetrical, as typified with Vendoconularia, typical of the structure seen in Vendozooans. Conulariids are, however, technically a part of the Ediacaran biota as their fossil record starts at latest parts of that period.

It is now also thought that the conulate trilobozoans derived their fourfold symmetry from a sixfold symmetry, as seen in Vendoconularia. This in turn, is thought to be originally derived from an ancestral disk-like trilobozoan three-fold symmetry.

Conulariids have generally been thought to be of Cnidarian affinity, occupying a position near the base of the Cnidarian family tree. However, since the 2010s, authors consider conulariids to be most closely related to the Scyphozoa, or the "true jellyfish". A possible arrangement is as relatives of the extant stalked jellyfish. However, the nature of Conulariids and their phylogenetic relationships to other organisms remain poorly understood, and the supposed cnidarian affinity remains speculative.

Pearls
Conulariids produced pearls within their shells, similar to the way molluscs such as oysters, other pelecypods, and some gastropods do today. These pearls give a clue as to the internal anatomy of the conulariid animal. But due to their calcium phosphate composition, their crystal structure, and their extreme age, these pearls tend to be rather unattractive for use in or as decorative objects.

List of genera

Aciconularia
Adesmoconularia
Anaconularia
Archaeoconularia
Australoconularia
Barbigodithreca
Calloconularia
Circonularia
Climacoconus
Conchopeltis
Conomedusites
Conulariella
Conularia
Conularina
Conulariopsis
Ctenoconularia
Diconularia
Eoconularia
Exoconularia
Flectoconularia
Garraconularia
Glyptoconularia
Gondaconularia
Hexangulaconularia
Holoconularia
Mabianoconullus
Mesoconularia
Metaconularia
Neoconularia
Notoconularia
Palaenigma
Paraconularia
Pseudoconularia
Quadrosiphogonuchites
Reticulaconularia
Tasmanoconularia

References

Bibliography

External links

http://www.uga.edu/strata/cincy/fauna/conulariida/Conularia.html

Staurozoa
Prehistoric cnidarians
Early Triassic extinctions
Cambrian genus extinctions